Berry Airfield (also known as 12-Mile Drome) is a former World War II airfield near Port Moresby, Papua New Guinea.

Also known as "12 Mile Drome" or "Bomana Drome", the airfield was named "Berry Airfield" in honor of P-39D 41-7165 pilot Major Jack W. Berry on November 10, 1942.

History
Berry Airfield was completed on May 15, 1943, however, there was little or no room for expansion without an extensive earth-moving project being put into action. The runway had an  base of crushed rock and pit gravel approximately 4,500' by 150'. It also had 40 dispersal bays, and 4 alert areas that would accommodate 15 fighter aircraft.

Berry hosted many units during its operational use, however, the only long-term unit assigned was the 8th Fighter Squadron (49th Fighter Group) which flew P-39 Airacobras from July 20, 1942 - November 8, 1942.

Today, the road from Port Moresby runs over the top of the old main runway. The Bomana Police Training College is located at the site of the former strip, and the Bomana War Cemetery is at the far end of the strip. Some of the officer's and command tents for the airfield were located in the high ground around the former field. Some war debris is scattered around the area, including barrels, metal pieces, and other objects.

See also

 USAAF in the Southwest Pacific
 Port Moresby Airfield Complex

 Kila Airfield (3 Mile Drome)
 Wards Airfield (5 Mile Drome)
 Jackson Airfield (7 Mile Drome)

 Schwimmer Airfield (14 Mile Drome)
 Durand Airfield (17 Mile Drome)
 Rogers (Rarona) Airfield (30 Mile Drome)
 Fishermans (Daugo Island) Airfield

References

 Maurer, Maurer (1983). Air Force Combat Units Of World War II. Maxwell AFB, Alabama: Office of Air Force History. .
 www.pacificwrecks.com

External links

Airfields of the United States Army Air Forces in Papua New Guinea
Defunct airports in Papua New Guinea
Airports established in 1943